KEDJ (103.1 FM, "The Edge") is a commercial radio station located in Jerome, Idaho, broadcasting to the Twin Falls, Idaho, area. KEDJ airs an active rock format.

History
102.9 was branded as “Z103” with a contemporary hits format.  In 1991, the call letters changed from KFMA to KZRT.  In late 1993, "Z103" became hot adult contemporary "Mix 103" KMVX.  This format lasted until 2012, when it flipped to sports "102.9 The Zone" KZNO. In 2014, the station moved to 103.1 and became active rock "The Edge" KEDJ.

External links

EDJ